Aitkenhead is a surname. Notable people with the surname include:

 Andy Aitkenhead (1904–1968), Canadian ice hockey player
 Decca Aitkenhead (born 1971), English journalist and writer
 John Aitkenhead (1910–1998), Scottish educationist
 Johnny Aitkenhead (1923–1987), Scottish footballer
 Walter Aitkenhead (1887–1966), Scottish footballer

See also
 Aikenhead (name)
 Aitkenhead Glacier, glacier of Antarctica